Kohima is a leading center of education in Nagaland and houses the following institutions:

Universities and tertiary institutions 
 Alder College (1992)
 Baptist College (1982)
 Capital College of Higher Education (2004)
 Kohima College (1967)
 Kohima Law College (1975)
 KROS College (2006)
 Model Christian College (2007)
 Modern College (1997)
 Mountain View Christian College (1991)
 Mount Olive College (1992)
 Nagaland Medical College (2022)
 Oriental College (1996)

The following are major Universities and tertiary institutions located in the Greater Kohima Metropolitan Area:
 Japfü Christian College, Kigwema (1996)
 Kohima Science College, Jotsoma (1961)
 Nagaland University, Meriema Campus (1994)
 Sazolie College, Jotsoma (2005)
 St. Joseph's College, Jakhama (1985)

Primary and secondary schools 

 Baptist High School (1959)
 Bethel Higher Secondary School (1981)
 Chandmari Higher Secondary School (1974)
 Coraggio School (2004)
 Dainty Buds School (1987)
 Don Bosco Higher Secondary School (1972)
 Fernwood School (1988)
 G. Rio School (2005)
 Holy Family School (1991)
 Little Flower Higher Secondary School (1964)
 Merhülietsa School (1974)
 Mezhür Higher Secondary School (1958)
 Ministers' Hill Baptist Higher Secondary School (1968)
 Mount Sinai Higher Secondary School (1987)
 Northfield School (2002)
 Rüzhükhrie Government Higher Secondary School (1941)
 Stella Higher Secondary School (1987)
 Trinity School (2003)
 Vikesel's Vision School (1994)
 The Vineyard School (2003)
 Vinyüzo School (2007)

See also 
 List of institutions of higher education in Nagaland
 List of schools in Nagaland

Higher education
Kohima